Brigadier-General Samuel Wragg Ferguson (November 3, 1834February 3, 1917) was a senior officer of the Confederate States Army who commanded cavalry in the Western Theater of the American Civil War. After the civil war, Ferguson served as a member of the Mississippi River Commission.

Early life and education
Samuel Wragg Ferguson was born in Charleston, South Carolina, on November 3, 1834, to James, a planter, and Abby Ann (née Barker) Ferguson. Educated at a private school in Charleston, he entered the United States Military Academy in 1852 and graduated in 1857. Before graduation, he joined Colonel Albert Sidney Johnson's Utah Expedition. He then went to St. Louis to join his regiment. After the expedition, he was assigned to Fort Walla Walla in the Washington Territory, where he stayed from 1859 to 1860. This all changed when he received the results of the 1860 presidential election. Hearing of the election of Abraham Lincoln, he immediately resigned and left for Charleston, South Carolina.

American Civil War
In March 1861, Ferguson was commissioned a captain in the South Carolina militia, afterwards being appointed Lieutenant and aide-de-camp to C.S. Army Brigadier-General P. G. T. Beauregard. He was one of the officers who received the formal surrender of U.S.  Army Major Robert Anderson at Fort Sumter, raised the first Confederate States flag, and posted the first guards at Fort Sumter. After the siege, he was sent to present the first Confederate flag struck by enemy shot to the Provisional Congress of the Confederate States. He was a lieutenant-colonel and aide-de-camp to General Beauregard during the Battle of Shiloh. During the Battle of Farmington, he was in the 28th Mississippi Cavalry Regiment. He commanded the unit while defending Vicksburg, and helped stop attacks made by U.S. Major-General William T. Sherman and U.S. Commodore David Porter.

On July 28, 1863, Ferguson was promoted to brigadier-general. He was subsequently recommended for promotion to Major-General, but Joseph Wheeler quickly objected. During Sherman's March to the Sea, Ferguson and his cavalrymen harassed the flank of the United States Army. When Sherman got close to Savannah, Ferguson's men left their horses and covered the Confederate retreat. He was then ordered to Danville, Virginia, but before arriving was ordered to go to Charlotte, North Carolina. From Charlotte he escorted Jefferson Davis into Georgia, where his unit was disbanded.

Later life
After the war Ferguson moved to Greenville, Mississippi, where he practiced law. He married Catherine Sarah Lee, daughter of Henry William and Eleanor Percy Lee who was a cousin of Robert Edward Lee. In 1876, he was appointed as president of the United States Board of Mississippi River Commissioners. He was also secretary and treasurer of the Mississippi Levee Board. In 1894, twenty thousand to forty thousand dollars mysteriously disappeared from the Mississippi Levee Board, of which Ferguson was both secretary and treasurer. Later that year, he suddenly left and moved to his hometown of Charleston where worked as a civil engineer. After staying in Charleston, Ferguson moved to Ecuador. It would be many years before he returned. At the outbreak of the Spanish–American War, he tried to join the war effort but he was turned down. On February 3, 1917, Ferguson died in Jackson, Mississippi, where he is buried at the Greenwood Cemetery along with other famous Confederate generals.

Selected works 
 Personal Memoirs of S. W. Ferguson (1900)

See also 
 List of Confederate States Army generals
 List of members of the United Confederate Veterans
 List of people from Charleston, South Carolina

References

Further reading
Eicher, John H., and David J. Eicher, Civil War High Commands. Stanford: Stanford University Press, 2001. .
Sifakis, Stewart. Who Was Who in the Civil War. New York: Facts On File, 1988. .

External links

 Official
 Heyward and Ferguson Family Papers at the College of Charleston
 Heyward and Ferguson Family Papers at the University of North Carolina at Chapel Hill
 Samuel Wragg Ferguson Papers at the Louisiana State University
 General information
 

1834 births
1917 deaths
19th-century American engineers
19th-century American Episcopalians
19th-century American lawyers
19th-century American male writers
19th-century American non-fiction writers
19th-century United States Army personnel
20th-century American Episcopalians
20th-century American non-fiction writers
20th-century American male writers
American civil engineers
American expatriates in Ecuador
American Freemasons
American lawyers admitted to the practice of law by reading law
American male non-fiction writers
American memoirists
American militia officers
American people of English descent
American people of Scottish descent
American people of Welsh descent
American slave owners
Burials in Mississippi
Cavalry commanders
Confederate States Army brigadier generals
Mississippi lawyers
Military personnel from Charleston, South Carolina
People from Greenville, Mississippi
People of South Carolina in the American Civil War
People of the Utah War
Stateless people
United States Army officers
United States Military Academy alumni